Ida Koťátková was a female international table tennis player from Czechoslovakia.

She won two bronze medals at the World Table Tennis Championships.

Her first bronze medal came in the women's doubles with Eliška Fürstová at the 1949 World Table Tennis Championships.

Her second medal came in the Corbillon Cup (women's team event) at the 1950 World Table Tennis Championships.

See also
 List of table tennis players
 List of World Table Tennis Championships medalists

References

Czechoslovak table tennis players
World Table Tennis Championships medalists